Minuscule 716 (in the Gregory-Aland numbering), ε448 (von Soden), is a Greek minuscule manuscript of the New Testament, on parchment. Palaeographically it has been assigned to the 14th century. The manuscript is in the British Library as Egerton MS 2784. The manuscript has complex contents. Scrivener labelled it as 565e.

Description 

The codex contains the text of the four Gospels, on 176 parchment leaves (size ).

The text is written in one column per page, 24-26 lines per page. The manuscript has ornamented headpieces, the initial letters in brown with pen-work decoration, the initial for Epsilon has anthropomorphic motif with a blessing hand. The decorations do not use colours.

The text is also divided according to the smaller Ammonian Sections (in Mark 242 sections), whose numbers are given at the margin, with references to the Eusebian Canons.

Text 

The Greek text of the codex is mixed with numerous Byzantine element.  Kurt Aland did not place it in any Category.

According to the Claremont Profile Method it creates textual cluster with minuscule 343 in Luke 1 and Luke 10. In Luke 20 it creates cluster with minuscule 686. Textually it is close to the textual family Kx.

History 

Scrivener dated the manuscript to the 12th century, Dean Burgon to the 13th century, Gregory dated it to the 14th century. Currently the manuscript is dated by the INTF to the 14th century.

Formerly the manuscript belonged to Bernard Quaritch, then it was held in Sotheby's. It belonged to Burgon and Rose. It was bought for the British Museum in 1893 (along with minuscule 714 and 715).

It was added to the list of New Testament manuscripts by Scrivener (565) and Gregory (716). Gregory saw the manuscript in 1883. The text was collated by Rose.

Burgon examined and described the manuscript in the Guardian from July 19, 1882.

See also 

 List of New Testament minuscules
 Biblical manuscript
 Textual criticism

References

Further reading

External links 
 Minuscule 716 at the British Library
 Minuscule 716 at the Encyclopedia of Textual Criticism

Greek New Testament minuscules
14th-century biblical manuscripts
Egerton collection